Electronic publishing (also referred to as publishing, digital publishing, or online publishing) includes the digital publication of e-books, digital magazines, and the development of digital libraries and catalogues. It also includes the editing of books, journals, and magazines to be posted on a screen (computer, e-reader, tablet, or smartphone).

About
Electronic publishing has become common in scientific publishing where it has been argued that peer-reviewed scientific journals are in the process of being replaced by electronic publishing. It is also becoming common to distribute books, magazines, and newspapers to consumers through tablet reading devices, a market that is growing by millions each year, generated by online vendors such as Apple's iTunes bookstore, Amazon's bookstore for Kindle, and books in the Google Play Bookstore. Market research suggested that half of all magazine and newspaper circulation would be via digital delivery by the end of 2015 and that half of all reading in the United States would be done without paper by 2015.

Although distribution via the Internet (also known as online publishing or web publishing when in the form of a website) is nowadays strongly associated with electronic publishing, there are many non-network electronic publications such as encyclopedias on CD and DVD, as well as technical and reference publications relied on by mobile users and others without reliable and high-speed access to a network. Electronic publishing is also being used in the field of test-preparation in developed as well as in developing economies for student education (thus partly replacing conventional books) – for it enables content and analytics combined – for the benefit of students. The use of electronic publishing for textbooks may become more prevalent with Apple Books from Apple Inc. and Apple's negotiation with the three largest textbook suppliers in the U.S.

Electronic publishing is increasingly popular in works of fiction. Electronic publishers are able to respond quickly to changing market demand, because the companies do not have to order printed books and have them delivered. E-publishing is also making a wider range of books available, including books that customers would not find in standard book retailers, due to insufficient demand for a traditional "print run". E-publication is enabling new authors to release books that would be unlikely to be profitable for traditional publishers. While the term "electronic publishing" is primarily used in the 2010s to refer to online and web-based publishers, the term has a history of being used to describe the development of new forms of production, distribution, and user interaction in regard to computer-based production of text and other interactive media.

History

Digitization
The first digitization initiative was in 1971 by Michael S. Hart, a student at the University of Illinois at Chicago, who launched Project Gutenberg, designed to make literature more accessible to everyone, through the internet. It took a while to develop, and in 1989 there were only 10 texts that were manually recopied on computer by Michael S. Hart himself and some volunteers. But with the appearance of the Web 1.0 in 1991 and its ability to connect documents together through static pages, the project moved quickly forward. Many more volunteers helped in developing the project by giving access to public domain classics.

In the 1970s, the French National Centre for Scientific Research digitized a thousand books from diverse subjects, mostly literature but also philosophy and science, dating back to the 12th century to present times, so as to build the foundations of a large dictionary, the Trésor de la langue française au Québec. This foundation of e-texts, named Frantext, was published on a compact disc under the brand name Discotext, and then on the worldwide web in 1998.

Mass-scale digitization
In 1974, American inventor and futurist Raymond Kurzweil developed a scanner which was equipped with an Omnifont software that enabled optical character recognition for numeric inputs. The digitization projects could then be more ambitious since the time needed for digitization decreased considerably, and digital libraries were on the rise. All over the world, e-libraries started to emerge.

The ABU (Association des Bibliophiles Universels), was a public digital library project created by the Cnam in 1993. It was the first French digital library in the network; suspended since 2002, they reproduced over a hundred texts that are still available.

In 1992, the Bibliothèque nationale de France launched a vast digitization program. The president François Mitterrand had wanted since 1988 to create a new and innovative digital library, and it was published in 1997 under the name of Gallica. In 2014, the digital library was offering 80 255 online books and over a million documents, including prints and manuscripts.

In 2003, Wikisource was launched, and the project aspired to constitute a digital and multilingual library that would be a complement to the Wikipedia project. It was originally named "Project Sourceberg", as a word play to remind the Project Gutenberg. Supported by the Wikimedia Foundation, Wikisource proposes digitized texts that have been verified by volunteers.

In December 2004, Google created Google Books, a project to digitize all the books available in the world (over 130 million books) to make them accessible online. 10 years later, 25 000 000 books, from a hundred countries and in 400 languages, are on the platform. This was possible because by that time, robotic scanners could digitize around 6 000 books per hour.

In 2008, the prototype of Europeana was launched; and by 2010, the project had been giving access to over 10 million digital objects. The Europeana library is a European catalog that offers index cards on millions of digital objects and links to their digital libraries. In the same year, HathiTrust was created to put together the contents of many university e-libraries from USA and Europe, as well as Google Books and Internet Archive. In 2016, over six millions of users had been using HathiTrust.

Electronic publishing
The first digitization projects were transferring physical content into digital content. Electronic publishing is aiming to integrate the whole process of editing and publishing (production, layout, publication) in the digital world.

Alain Mille, in the book Pratiques de l'édition numérique (edited by Michael E. Sinatra and Marcello Vitali-Rosati), says that the beginnings of Internet and the Web are the very core of electronic publishing, since they pretty much determined the biggest changes in the production and diffusion patterns. Internet has a direct effect on the publishing questions, letting creators and users go further in the traditional process (writer-editor-publishing house).

The traditional publishing, and especially the creation part, were first revolutionized by new desktop publishing softwares appearing in the 1980s, and by the text databases created for the encyclopedias and directories. At the same time the multimedia was developing quickly, combining book, audiovisual and computer science characteristics. CDs and DVDs appear, permitting the visualization of these dictionaries and encyclopedias on computers.

The arrival and democratization of Internet is slowly giving small publishing houses the opportunity to publish their books directly online. Some websites, like Amazon, let their users buy eBooks; Internet users can also find many educative platforms (free or not), encyclopedic websites like Wikipedia, and even digital magazines platforms. The eBook then becomes more and more accessible through many different supports, like the e-reader and even smartphones. The digital book had, and still has, an important impact on publishing houses and their economical models; it is still a moving domain, and they yet have to master the new ways of publishing in a digital era.

Online edition
Based on new communications practices of the web 2.0 and the new architecture of participation, online edition opens the door to a collaboration of a community to elaborate and improve contents on Internet, while also enriching reading through collective reading practices. The web 2.0 not only links documents together, as did the web 1.0, it also links people together through social media: that's why it's called the Participative (or participatory) Web.

Many tools were put in place to foster sharing and creative collective contents. One of the many is the Wikipedia encyclopedia, since it is edited, corrected and enhanced by millions of contributors. OpenStreetMap is also based on the same principle. Blogs and comment systems are also now renown as online edition and publishing, since it is possible through new interactions between the author and its readers, and can be an important method for inspiration but also for visibility.

Process

The electronic publishing process follows some aspects of the traditional paper-based publishing process but differs from traditional publishing in two ways: 1) it does not include using an offset printing press to print the final product and 2) it avoids the distribution of a physical product (e.g., paper books, paper magazines, or paper newspapers). Because the content is electronic, it may be distributed over the Internet and through electronic bookstores, and users can read the material on a range of electronic and digital devices, including desktop computers, laptops, tablet computers, smartphones or e-reader tablets. The consumer may read the published content online a website, in an application on a tablet device, or in a PDF document on a computer. In some cases, the reader may print the content onto paper using a consumer-grade ink-jet or laser printer or via a print-on-demand system. Some users download digital content to their devices, enabling them to read the content even when their device is not connected to the Internet (e.g., on an airplane flight).

Distributing content electronically as software applications ("apps") has become popular in the 2010s, due to the rapid consumer adoption of smartphones and tablets. At first, native apps for each mobile platform were required to reach all audiences, but in an effort toward universal device compatibility, attention has turned to using HTML5 to create web apps that can run on any browser and function on many devices. The benefit of electronic publishing comes from using three attributes of digital technology: XML tags to define content, style sheets to define the look of content, and metadata (data about data) to describe the content for search engines, thus helping users to find and locate the content (a common example of metadata is the information about a song's songwriter, composer, genre that is electronically encoded along with most CDs and digital audio files; this metadata makes it easier for music lovers to find the songs they are looking for). With the use of tags, style sheets, and metadata, this enables "reflowable" content that adapts to various reading devices (tablet, smartphone, e-reader, etc.) or electronic delivery methods.

Because electronic publishing often requires text mark-up (e.g., HyperText Markup Language or some other markup language) to develop online delivery methods, the traditional roles of typesetters and book designers, who created the printing set-ups for paper books, have changed. Designers of digitally published content must have a strong knowledge of mark-up languages, the variety of reading devices and computers available, and the ways in which consumers read, view or access the content. However, in the 2010s, new user friendly design software is becoming available for designers to publish content in this standard without needing to know detailed programming techniques, such as Adobe Systems' Digital Publishing Suite and Apple's iBooks Author. The most common file format is .epub, used in many e-book formats. .epub is a free and open standard available in many publishing programs. Another common format is .folio, which is used by the Adobe Digital Publishing Suite to create content for Apple's iPad tablets and apps.

Academic publishing

After an article is submitted to an academic journal for consideration, there can be a delay ranging from several months to more than two years before it is published in a journal, rendering journals a less than ideal format for disseminating current research. In some fields such as astronomy and some areas of physics, the role of the journal in disseminating the latest research has largely been replaced by preprint repositories such as arXiv.org. However, scholarly journals still play an important role in quality control and establishing scientific credit. In many instances, the electronic materials uploaded to preprint repositories are still intended for eventual publication in a peer-reviewed journal. There is statistical evidence that electronic publishing provides wider dissemination, because when a journal is available online, a larger number of researchers can access the journal. Even if a professor is working in a university that does not have a certain journal in its library, she may still be able to access the journal online. A number of journals have, while retaining their longstanding peer review process to ensure that the research is done properly, established electronic versions or even moved entirely to electronic publication.

Copyright
In the early 2000s, many of the existing copyright laws were designed around printed books, magazines and newspapers. For example, copyright laws often set limits on how much of a book can be mechanically reproduced or copied.  Electronic publishing raises new questions in relation to copyright, because if an e-book or e-journal is available online, millions of Internet users may be able to view a single electronic copy of the document, without any "copies" being made.

Emerging evidence suggests that e-publishing may be more collaborative than traditional paper-based publishing; e-publishing often involves more than one author, and the resulting works are more accessible, since they are published online. At the same time, the availability of published material online opens more doors for plagiarism, unauthorized use, or re-use of the material. Some publishers are trying to address these concerns. For example, in 2011, HarperCollins limited the number of times that one of its e-books could be lent in a public library. Other publishers, such as Penguin, are attempting to incorporate e-book elements into their regular paper publications.

Examples

Electronic versions of traditional media
 CD-ROM
 E-book
 Electronic journal
 Online magazine
 Online newspaper
 Online catalog
 Online brochure
 Online newsletter
 Online presentation
 Online flyer
 Online menu
 Online pamphlet
 PDF

New media
 Blog
 Collaborative software
 Digital publication app
 Enhanced publication
 File sharing
 Mobile apps
 Podcast

Business models
 Digital distribution
 Online advertising
 Open access (publishing)
 Pay-per-view
 Print on demand
 Self-publishing
 Subscriptions
 Non-subsidy publishing

See also
 Desktop publishing
 Electronic typesetting
 Mobile publishing

References

External links

W3C Digital Publishing Activity

 
Publishing